Ruegen (Rügen) is a German island off the Pomeranian coast in the Baltic Sea.
Ruegen, Rugen, Rügen, or variation, may also refer to:

Places
 Principality of Rügen, a principality of the Holy Roman Empire, based around the island
 Duchy of Rugen, a duchy of the Kingdom of Denmark, predecessor to the principality
 Rügen (district), a former district of Germany based around the island, successor to the principality
 Vorpommern-Rügen, a district of Germany, successor to the district of Rugen
 Vorpommern-Rügen – Vorpommern-Greifswald I, an electoral district of Germany
 Stralsund – Nordvorpommern – Rügen (electoral district), an electoral district of Germany
 Nord-Rügen
 West-Rügen
 Rügen Chalk (Ruegen Formation), a white chalk geologic formation in Germany

Military
 Operation Rügen, code name for the 1937 bombing of Guernica during the Spanish Civil War
 Wars of the Rügen Succession (14th century)
 Battle of Rügen (disambiguation)

Other uses
 Strelasund Crossing, or Rügen Bridge, the bridge from the mainland to Rügen island
 Tyrone Rugen, a fictional character from The Princess Bride

See also

 Rugia (disambiguation)
 Rugii
 Rugiland
 
 
 
 Regen (disambiguation)